Jakob Lukas Schabelitz  (10 March 1827 – 28 January 1889) was a Swiss publisher and bookseller.  He joined the Communist League and was an associate and friend of Karl Marx and Frederick Engels in the late 1840s and early 1850s.  Schabelitz died in 1899.

References

1827 births
1899 deaths
German socialists
German revolutionaries